Joseph Melvin Reynolds (16 July 1924, Woodlawn, Tennessee – 11 June 1997, Baton Rouge, Louisiana) was an American professor of physics and a university administrator. He was a Guggenheim Fellow for the academic year 1958–1959.

Biography
Reynolds attended David Lipscomb College (now Lipscomb University) from 1942 to 1944 and then transferred to Vanderbilt University, where he received a bachelor's degree in 1946. At Yale University he graduated with M.S. in 1947 and Ph.D. in physics in 1950. His thesis advisor was Cecil Taverner Lane (1904–1991). As a graduate student, Reynolds also taught for a year at Connecticut College. In the physics department of Louisiana State University (LSU), he was from 1950 to 1954 an assistant professor, from 1954 to 1958 an assistant professor, from 1958 to 1962 a full professor, and from 1962 to 1965 Boyd Professor. From 1962 to 1965 he was head of the department of physics and astronomy. At LSU he was promoted in 1965 to vice president of graduate studies and research development, in 1968 to vice president of instruction and research, and in 1981 to vice president for academic affairs, holding that position until 1985.

In 1957 Reynolds was elected a Fellow of the American Physical Society. As a Guggenheim Fellow, he spent the academic year 1958–1959 as a visiting professor at Leiden University's Kamerlingh-Onnes Laboratory. In 1966 he was elected a Fellow of the American Association for the Advancement of Science. He spent a sabbatical year from 1969 to 1970 as a visiting scholar at Stanford University. Using what he learned at Stanford, he helped to establish LSU's gravitational radiation detection program.

Reynolds helped to formulate U.S. space science policies and their implementations. He helped to initiate the space station's microgravity program and supported the Schiff-Everitt experiment.

Selected publications

References

External links

1924 births
1997 deaths
20th-century American physicists
Vanderbilt University alumni
Yale University alumni
Louisiana State University faculty
Fellows of the American Association for the Advancement of Science
Fellows of the American Physical Society
People from Montgomery County, Tennessee
Lipscomb University alumni